Capreol railway station, located in the community of Capreol, Greater Sudbury, Ontario, Canada, is a stop for Via Rail's transcontinental The Canadian passenger rail service. The station building was constructed in 1915 by the Canadian Northern Railway (CNoR) at a divisional point on the Canadian Northern system. It became part of the Canadian National (CN Rail) railway system when Canadian Northern was amalgamated with other railways to form CN. After the creation of Via Rail, ownership and management of the station, along with passenger services, were transferred to Via Rail, while freight operations continued with CN Rail.

The nearby former home used by local Canadian Northern and Canadian National superintendents in Capreol has been converted into the Northern Ontario Railroad Museum, which showcases elements of Capreol and Northern Ontario's railway heritage.

See also
Sudbury Junction station
Sudbury station (Ontario)
Sudbury Ontario Northland Bus Terminal
Sudbury Airport -

References

External links
 
 VIA Rail: Capreol railway station

Via Rail stations in Ontario
Railway stations in Greater Sudbury
Canadian Northern Railway stations in Ontario